There are two anthems of Norfolk Island:

 God Save the King, the official anthem
 Pitcairn Anthem, the unofficial anthem